Philippe Cattiau (28 July 1892 – 18 February 1962) was a French épée and foil fencer who won a total of eight Olympic medals between 1920 and 1936.

He was born in Saint-Malo in Brittany.

A stadium in the Paris suburb of Villeneuve-la-Garenne now bears his name.

See also
List of Olympic medalists in fencing (men)
List of multiple Summer Olympic medalists
List of multiple Olympic gold medalists

References

1892 births
1962 deaths
Sportspeople from Saint-Malo
French male épée fencers
Olympic fencers of France
Fencers at the 1920 Summer Olympics
Fencers at the 1924 Summer Olympics
Fencers at the 1928 Summer Olympics
Fencers at the 1932 Summer Olympics
Fencers at the 1936 Summer Olympics
Olympic gold medalists for France
Olympic silver medalists for France
Olympic bronze medalists for France
Olympic medalists in fencing
Medalists at the 1920 Summer Olympics
Medalists at the 1924 Summer Olympics
Medalists at the 1928 Summer Olympics
Medalists at the 1932 Summer Olympics
Medalists at the 1936 Summer Olympics
French male foil fencers
20th-century French people